The Veritas Volume Manager (VVM or VxVM) is a proprietary logical volume manager from Veritas (which was part of Symantec until January 2016).

Details
It is available for Windows, AIX, Solaris, Linux, and HP-UX. A modified version is bundled with HP-UX as its built-in volume manager. It offers volume management and Multipath I/O functionalities (when used with Veritas Dynamic Multi-Pathing feature). The Veritas Volume Manager Storage Administrator (VMSA) is a GUI manager.

Versions
 Veritas Volume Manager 7.4.1
 Release date (Windows): February 2019
 Veritas Volume Manager 6.0
 Release date (Windows): December 2011
 Release date (UNIX): December 2011
 Veritas Volume Manager 5.1
 Release date (Windows): August 2008
 Release date (UNIX): December 2009
 Veritas Volume Manager 5.0
 Release date (UNIX): August 2006
 Release date (Windows): January 2007
 Veritas Volume Manager 4.1
 Release date (UNIX): April 2005
 Release date (Windows): June 2004
 Veritas Volume Manager 4.0
 Release date: February 2004
 Veritas Volume Manager 3.5
 Release date: September 2002
 Veritas Volume Manager 3.2
 Veritas Volume Manager 3.1 
 Release date: August 2000
 Veritas Volume Manager 3.0

Microsoft once licensed a version of Veritas Volume Manager for Windows 2000, allowing operating systems to store and modify large amounts of data. Symantec acquired Veritas on July 2, 2005, and claimed Microsoft misused their intellectual property to develop functionalities in Windows Server 2003, later Windows Vista and Windows Server 2008, which competed with Veritas' Storage Foundation, according to Michael Schallop, the director of legal affairs at Symantec. A representative claims Microsoft bought all "intellectual property rights for all relevant technologies from Veritas in 2004". The lawsuit was dropped in 2008; terms were not disclosed.

See also
 Veritas Storage Foundation
 Veritas Volume Replicator
 Symantec Operations Readiness Tools (SORT)

References

External links
 Veritas Volume Manager documentation
 Veritas Volume Manager Quick Reference
 Advanced Veritas Volume Manager Quick Reference
 Symantec Operations Readiness Tools (SORT)
 Cuddletech Veritas Kickstart
 UNIX WAY Veritas Volume Manager documentation

Storage software